The Hardturm was a football stadium located in Zürich's Kreis 5. Opened in 1929, it was the home of the Grasshopper Club Zürich until it closed in 2007. It was a host stadium for the 1954 FIFA World Cup.

The land for the stadium was bought by Walter Schoeller who passed it on his club free of charge. When the stadium was opened in 1929 it could hold 27,500 spectators. After many reconstructions the capacity was 38,000 in 1986, on time for the 100-Year Anniversary of the Grasshopper Club Zürich. Before closing, Hardturm could hold 17,666 spectators with standing areas for the home and away fans. In international games the Hardturm could hold 16,600 spectators with seating places in all areas.

During re-construction of the Letzigrund stadium, Grasshoppers shared use of the Hardturm with local rivals FC Zürich for the 2006–07 season. This led to protests by Grasshopper fans.

The Hardturm stadium closed in September 2007. Grasshoppers now play at the Letzigrund Stadium.

Hardturm's demolition started in December 2008 and a new stadium, Stadion Zürich is planned on the ground of the Hardturm, but the project has been stalled.

See also
List of football stadiums in Switzerland

References

External links
Grasshopper Zürich Tribute 

Defunct football venues in Switzerland
1954 FIFA World Cup stadiums
Sports venues in Zürich
District 5 of Zürich
Grasshopper Club Zürich
Defunct sports venues in Switzerland